Edgar Cheung Ka-long (born 10 June 1997) is a Hong Kong left-handed foil fencer, two-time individual Asian champion, two-time Olympian, and 2021 individual Olympic champion.

Cheung is the first athlete representing Hong Kong in history to win an Olympic gold medal in fencing and the second to become an Olympic champion.

Career 
Cheung Ka Long was born to parents who both played national league basketball in Hong Kong. He took up fencing in the fourth grade. In 2013, he was named Hong Kong's Most Promising Young Athlete at the Hong Kong Sports Stars Awards. In 2014, he was named an Outstanding Junior Athlete by the Hong Kong Sports Institute; he won a bronze in team foil at the Asian Fencing Championships and at the Asian Games that same year. In 2015, he earned two bronzes, one in individual foil and another in team foil during the Asian Fencing Championships. In 2016, he won gold and a bronze in team in the Asian Fencing Championships. At the Olympics in foil, he defeated Heo Jun in the round of 32 before losing to Guilherme Toldo in the round of 16, finishing 14th overall. In 2017, Cheung won gold in individual foil at the Junior World Championships. He then earned a silver medal in individual foil and a bronze in team foil in the Asian Fencing Championships. In 2018, he won a silver in team foil at the Asian Fencing Championships along with a bronze in individual foil and a silver in team foil at the Asian Games. In 2019, he earned a silver medal in the Turin Grand Prix, a bronze in the Anaheim Grand Prix as well as a silver in individual foil and a bronze in team foil at the Asian Fencing Championships.

In 2021 at the Tokyo Olympics, Cheung and Tse Ying Suet were the flag bearers for Hong Kong. In foil, he defeated Julien Mertine in the round of 32, 2018 world champion Alessio Foconi in the round of 16, Kirill Borodachev in the quarterfinals and Alexander Choupenitch in the semifinals. In the final he faced the reigning Olympic champion Daniele Garozzo; after trailing 1–4 he fought back to win by a score of 15–11. This was Hong Kong's first Olympic gold medal in fencing and its second-ever gold.

Medal Record

Olympic Games

World Championship

Asian Championship

Grand Prix

World Cup

Impact 
The term "Ka-long effect" was coined after his historic gold in the Tokyo Olympics. Fencing schools witnessed a surge in calls from parents wanting their kids to take up lessons, as the sport received a huge boost in popularity.

References

External links 
 

1997 births
Asian Games bronze medalists for Hong Kong
Asian Games medalists in fencing
Asian Games silver medalists for Hong Kong
Fencers at the 2014 Asian Games
Fencers at the 2016 Summer Olympics
Fencers at the 2018 Asian Games
Fencers at the 2020 Summer Olympics
Living people
Medalists at the 2014 Asian Games
Medalists at the 2018 Asian Games
Medalists at the 2020 Summer Olympics
Olympic fencers of Hong Kong
Olympic gold medalists for Hong Kong
Olympic medalists in fencing
Hong Kong male foil fencers
Left-handed fencers
World Fencing Championships medalists